Hederorkis is a genus of flowering plants from the orchid family, Orchidaceae. It contains two known species, both native to islands in the Indian Ocean (Seychelles and Mauritius).

Description 
As opposed to Polystachya (the largest genus in the subtribe), Hederorkis lacks pseudobulbs.  The inflorescence is lateral.

Species
 Hederorkis scandederis Thouars (1822) - Mauritius,  Réunion
 Hederorkis seychellensis Bosser (1976) - Aldabra, Seychelles

See also
 List of Orchidaceae genera

References

 Pridgeon, A.M., Cribb, P.J., Chase, M.A. & Rasmussen, F. eds. (1999). Genera Orchidacearum 1. Oxford Univ. Press.
 Pridgeon, A.M., Cribb, P.J., Chase, M.A. & Rasmussen, F. eds. (2001). Genera Orchidacearum 2. Oxford Univ. Press.
 Pridgeon, A.M., Cribb, P.J., Chase, M.A. & Rasmussen, F. eds. (2003). Genera Orchidacearum 3. Oxford Univ. Press
 Berg Pana, H. 2005. Handbuch der Orchideen-Namen. Dictionary of Orchid Names. Dizionario dei nomi delle orchidee. Ulmer, Stuttgart
 Govaerts, R. (2003). World Checklist of Monocotyledons Database in ACCESS: 1-71827. The Board of Trustees of the Royal Botanic Gardens, Kew. Published on the Internet; http://www.kew.org/wcsp/ accessed Nov.12.2010.
 World Checklist of Selected Plant Families. (DATE). The Board of Trustees of the Royal Botanic Gardens, Kew.

Polystachyinae
Orchids of Africa
Flora of Seychelles
Vandeae genera